Gomez's web-footed salamander (Bolitoglossa gomezi) is a species of salamander in the family Plethodontidae.
It is found in Costa Rica and Panama.
Its natural habitat is subtropical or tropical moist lowland forests.

References

Bolitoglossa
Amphibians described in 2007